Sun Hwa may refer to:
Sun-hwa (name), Korean given name
A rank of government artist during Korea's Joseon Dynasty; see hwawon
Sun Hwa Arts School

See also
Sunhwa
Sunhwa-dong, district of Jung-gu, Seoul, South Korea